Brunia gibonica is a moth of the family Erebidae. It was described by Karel Černý in 2009. It is found in Thailand and southern Vietnam.

References

Lithosiina
Moths described in 2009
Moths of Asia